Dubai Multi Commodities Centre (DMCC) is the UAE's largest free-trade zone that is located in the Jumeirah Lake Towers district of Dubai. Created in 2002, it serves as a commodities exchange that deals in four main sectors: precious commodities (e.g., gold, diamonds); energy; steel and metals and agricultural commodities (e.g., tea, cotton). In August 2020, the Investment Corporation of Dubai, a sovereign wealth fund, became the parent company of the autonomous DMCC as part of a major restructuring.

History 
On the 1st of May 2002, then-Crown Prince of Dubai Mohammed bin Rashid Al Maktoum issued   directing the establishment of the free zone and the objective of the freezone to be a center of commodities trading.

The Dubai Diamond Exchange (DDE) was established in 2004 to facilitate the development of the diamond and coloured gems market. Dubai ranks third behind Antwerp and Mumbai in the leading global diamond hubs in terms of trade, growing from $300 million (Dh1.10 billion) in trade in 2002 to $26 billion in 2016. The Dubai Pearl Exchange (DPE) provides facilities for traders in pearls and holds events like the World Pearl Forum. In early 2011, DPE held the first pearl auctions outside of the Far East.

In 2012, the DMCC launched its own financial products such as the Dubai Commodity Asset Management (DCAM), Dubai Shariah Asset Management (DSAM), DMCC Tradeflow, and Dubai Gold & Commodities Exchange (DGCX).

In 2018, the DMCC  launched the Middle East's first Google for Entrepreneurs Global Tech Hub with AstroLabs Dubai.

In 2020, the DMCC underwent major restructuring. While previously acting as both a free zone and its own authority, the structure of the entity was changed, with the DMCC and DMCC Authority split into separate entities and the DMCC as a center was transferred to the control of the Investment Corporation of Dubai, and the DMCC Authority was transferred under the control of the Dubai Executive Council as a full dubai government department.

Overview 
DMCC Free Zone is the largest free-trade zone in the UAE, with more than 21,000 registered members as of 2022. In 2022, DMCC was named number one global free zone for an eighth consecutive year by the Financial Times FDi magazine.

DMCC supports commodity trading through organizations such as the Dubai Diamond Exchange (DDE), the Dubai Pearl Exchanges (DPE), DMCC Tradeflow, the Dubai Good Delivery Standard (DGD) for Gold, the DMCC Tea Centre, and the DMCC Coffee Centre.

Crypto currency 
DMCC has issued first сrypto assets trading license  for making over-the-counter transactions with cryptocurrencies at 26 May 2021 in order to develop the crypto industry in the United Arab Emirates. Until the moment trading operations with crypto currency were illegal in UAE.

DMCC Authority 
The DMCC Authority is the Government of Dubai regulatory body for the DMCC. The DMCC Authority is headed by a Chief Executive and a Board of Directors. The Ruler of Dubai appoints the Board of Directors, and the Chief Executive is appointed by the Dubai Executive Council.

Awards 
fDi Global Free Zones of the Year, 2015, 2016, 2017, 2018 and 2019, 2020, 2021 and 2022.
Global Islamic Finance Award for Best Supporting Institution, 2014.
 Facilitating Most Innovative Structured Transaction Award in 2007, Deal of the Year Award.
 Dubai Shariah Asset Management awarded as Best Shariah Compliant product provider, and DSAM Kauthar Commodity Fund received Best Funds of Funds Award, at the Hedge Funds World Middle East Conference 2010.
 Best Fund-of-Funds, Failaka Islamic Fund Award, April 21, 2010.

Property 

DMCC, for which Jumeirah Lakes Towers (JLT) (Arabic: أبراج بحيرات جميرا) is the physical address, is a 200-hectare mixed-use free zone is grouped into clusters each comprising three tower blocks around three large lakes and a central park. There are 68 towers and the 200-hectare development currently comprises approximately 180,000 sq/m of commercial, residential and retail space.

Almas Tower, the headquarters of DMCC, was completed in mid-2008, is the world's 31st tallest structure. The 68-floor building houses around a thousand diamond companies, diamond vaults, a diamond trading floor, and the Almas Conference Centre (ACC). DMCC's 2017 plan for the Uptown Dubai district includes more than 10 million square feet of commercial and residential space, more than 200 retail and F&B outlets, alongside 3000 residences, a central entertainment plaza and luxury hotels.

List of JLT Towers

See also
 Dubai
 Jumeirah Lake Towers
 JLT Free Zone
 Almas Tower
 Armada Towers
 Dubai Ports World
 Dubai Marina
 List of free Trade Zones in Dubai

References 

Commodity markets in the United Arab Emirates
Finance in the United Arab Emirates
Free-trade zones of the United Arab Emirates
Financial regulatory authorities of the United Arab Emirates